Henrique Campos Santos, sometimes known as just Henrique (born December 15, 1990), is a Brazilian footballer who plays as an attacking midfielder for Tombense.

Career
Born in São Paulo, Henrique Santos began his career on Portuguesa, and made his debut on 18 August 2009, against Campinense. On 19 March 2011, he scored his first professional goal, against Mirassol.

Career statistics

Honours
Portuguesa
 Campeonato Brasileiro Série B: 2011
 Campeonato Paulista Série A2: 2013

References

External links

1990 births
Living people
Footballers from São Paulo
Brazilian footballers
Association football midfielders
Associação Portuguesa de Desportos players
Campeonato Brasileiro Série A players
Campeonato Brasileiro Série B players
Club Athletico Paranaense players
Paraná Clube players
Botafogo Futebol Clube (SP) players
América Futebol Clube (MG) players
Esporte Clube XV de Novembro (Piracicaba) players
Cuiabá Esporte Clube players
Grêmio Novorizontino players
Esporte Clube Novo Hamburgo players
Grêmio Osasco Audax Esporte Clube players
Clube Atlético Linense players
Tombense Futebol Clube players